Ngin Marady (born 1999), also known as Ngin Rosa, is a Cambodian model, actress and beauty pageant titleholder who won Miss Universe Cambodia 2021. She represented Cambodia at Miss Universe 2021 in Eilat, Israel.

Early life
Ngin was born on October 27, 1999, and grew up in Phnom Penh. She works as a model and professional actress. As an ally, she uses her platform to campaign against discrimination against the LGBTQ community. In 2016, Ngin started working for Revlon Cambodia. She is also the brand ambassador of a famous brand in Cambodia.

Ngin is not new to the world of beauty pageants, having previously participated in the Miss Cat of the City 2016 event and won the 'Best in Catwalk' award.

Pageantry

Miss Universe Cambodia 2021 
On October 28, 2021, Ngin competed with 19 other candidates at Miss Universe Cambodia 2021 in Phnom Penh, where she won the following special awards as Best in Swimsuit and Best in Interview. At the end, Marady was crowned Miss Universe Cambodia 2021 by the previous titleholder Sarita Reth.

Miss Universe 2021 
As Miss Universe Cambodia 2021, Marady represented Cambodia at Miss Universe 2021 in Eilat, Israel, where she failed to place in the semifinals. During the national costume competition, she unintentionally garnered the attention of the media when the back part of her intricate costume broke off and fell to the ground, requiring the organizers to assist her and intervene for nearly 5 minutes during the live broadcast.

References

External links

 

Miss Universe 2021 contestants
1999 births
Living people
Cambodian beauty pageant winners
Cambodian female models
People from Phnom Penh